Neodavisia is a genus of snout moths. It was described by William Barnes and James Halliday McDunnough in 1914.

Species
 Neodavisia melusina
 Neodavisia singularis (Barnes & McDunnough, 1913)

References

Pyralinae
Pyralidae genera